The 2017 Manly Warringah Sea Eagles season was the 68th in the club's history since their entry into the then New South Wales Rugby Football League premiership in 1947.

The 2017 Sea Eagles was coached by former Australian international Trent Barrett. With the retirement of long time captain Jamie Lyon, the team captain was Daly Cherry-Evans with Jake Trbojevic named as vice-captain. The club competed in the National Rugby League's 2017 Telstra Premiership and played its home games at the 23,000 capacity Brookvale Oval, which for the first time was known as Lottoland due to a sponsorship agreement.

Squad list

2017 signings/transfers
Note: The "Out" column is from the players who were with the team as of the end of the 2016 NRL season. Players who left the club before the end of the season (e.g. Tom Symonds) are not included.

Gains
Cameron Cullen from Gold Coast Titans
Blake Green from Melbourne Storm
Jackson Hastings from Sydney Roosters
Brian Kelly from Gold Coast Titans
Jarrad Kennedy from Canberra Raiders
Shaun Lane from New Zealand Warriors
Lloyd Perrett from Canterbury-Bankstown Bulldogs
Peter Schuster from rugby union
Curtis Sironen from Wests Tigers
Kelepi Tanginoa from Parramatta Eels
Akuila Uate from Newcastle Knights
Jonathan Wright from New Zealand Warriors

Out
Jamie Buhrer to Newcastle Knights
Nathan Green to released
Liam Knight to Sydney Roosters
Blake Leary to North Queensland Cowboys
Jamie Lyon to retired
Steve Matai to retired*
Nate Myles to Melbourne Storm*
Matt Parcell to Leeds Rhinos
Josh Starling to Newcastle Knights
Brett Stewart to retired*
Siosaia Vave to Parramatta Eels
Brayden Wiliame to Catalans Dragons
* Seeking medical retirement as of 10 February 2017.  * Nate Myles released on 8 June

Kit

Milestones
Round 1: Brian Kelly made his first grade debut

Ladder

NRL Auckland Nines

Quarter Final

Trial Games

Fixtures
2017 NRL draw - Manly-Warringah Sea Eagles.

Regular season

Representative Round

Bye

Bye

* 13 May - Manly home game despite playing Brisbane Broncos in Brisbane. Match played as part of an NRL double header at Suncorp Stadium.* 1 July - Manly home game played in Perth.

Finals

Player statistics
Note: Games and (sub) show total games played, e.g. 1 (1) is 2 games played.

 On 8 June, Manly released Nate Myles from the remainder of his contract. 5 days later he announced that he had signed with the Melbourne Storm.

Representative Players

International

 Australia – Jake Trbojevic
 Fiji – Apisai Koroisau, Akuila Uate*
 New Zealand – Martin Taupau
 Samoa – Pita Godinet
 Tonga – Addin Fonua-Blake

* Akuila Uate selected in Fiji squad for their game against Tonga, but did not play.

State of Origin

 New South Wales – Jake Trbojevic, Tom Trbojevic*
 Queensland – Nate Myles

* Tom Trbojevic named as 20th man for Games 2 and 3 of the State of Origin series.

City vs Country Origin

 City – Curtis Sironen
 Country – Brian Kelly

References

External links
Manly Warringah Sea Eagles official website
National Rugby League official website

Manly Warringah Sea Eagles seasons
Manly-Warringah Sea Eagles season